The Bell House is a bar and music/comedy venue in Brooklyn, New York. In September 2008 it was opened for the first time. It was the usual recording venue for the NPR program Ask Me Another during that program's run.

Shows

2010 
In 19–20 January 2010, French electropop singer Charlotte Gainsbourg performed at The Bell House to promote her third album IRM.

On June 22nd, 2010, the movie Tell Your Friends! The Concert Film! was recorded at the Bell House. It went on to have its world premiere at the 2011 SXSW Film Festival. It starred Reggie Watts, Kurt Braunohler, Kristen Schaal, Liam McEneaney, and Kumail Nanjiani.

2011 
On 20 October 2011, comedy and interview podcast How Was Your Week with Julie Klausner hosted by Julie Klausner recorded its first live show with Ted Leo, Fred Armisen, Paul F. Tompkins and Billy Eichner.

2012 
On December 21, 2012, Netflix original comedy special John Hodgman: Ragnarok filmed here.

2013 
On 27 June 2013, alt-country trio Puss n Boots recorded live tracks from the venue for their 2014 debut full-length album No Fools, No Fun.

2014 
On 30 May 2014, indie rock group Bambi Kino performed a benefit concert.

On 5 June 2014, Americana/folk group Molly and the Zombies performed at The Bell House with Jared Hart of The Scandals and Dave Hause as opening acts.

2015 
On 11 September 2015, a preview of humorist John Hodgman's show Vacationland played.

2016
On 10 January 2016, comedian Liam McEneaney recorded his second album, Working Class Fancy, for Comedy Dynamics at The Bell House, with support acts Colin Jost, Dave Hill, and Rob Paravonian.

On 17 December 2016, YouTuber, comedian and entertainer Joe Santagato had a charity meet and greet event here.

2017
On 6 September 2017, the rock supergroup Filthy Friends performed.

2018
The tenth anniversary of the venue was celebrated with shows featuring Waxahatchee, Night Shops and Anna St. Louis as well as Shellac, and Ex Hex.

References

External links 
Official site

2008 establishments in New York City